A special election for the United States House of Representatives in North Carolina's 12th congressional district was held on November 4, 2014, to fill the vacancy caused by the resignation of U.S. Rep. Mel Watt following his appointment to head the Federal Housing Administration.

North Carolina Governor Pat McCrory chose to hold the election concurrently with the regular 2014 general elections, rather than hold a separate special election at an earlier date to fill the vacancy. Party primary elections for the seat would be held May 6. Primary runoffs, if needed, were scheduled for July 15 but proved unnecessary, because the only primary winner won more than 40 percent of the vote. According to politician Gerry Cohen, the primary was the first special primary election in North Carolina history, because in previous special elections, committees or conventions of party leaders selected their nominees.

The winner of the special election would serve through the remaining months of the 113th Congress, while the winner of the regular general election being held the same day would serve in the 114th Congress. This is essentially the same procedure used in North Carolina in 1992 to fill the vacancy in the First Congressional District (other than the addition of a primary election). Because Watt resigned in January and the winner of the special election was not seated until after the November election result is official, the district was without a representative for more than 11 months.

Background
Democratic Congressman Mel Watt was confirmed by the United States Senate on December 10, 2013, to head the Federal Housing Finance Agency. He resigned from Congress on January 6, 2014, the day he took office as director of FHFA.

Democratic primary

Candidates

Declared
 Alma Adams, state representative
 George Battle III, general counsel to the Charlotte-Mecklenburg school board
 Marcus Brandon, state representative
 Malcolm Graham, state senator
 Curtis C. Osborne, attorney

Withdrew
 Brad Craver, management consultant
 Beverly M. Earle, state representative and nominee for Mayor of Charlotte in 2007
 James "Smuggie" Mitchell, Jr., former Charlotte City Council member and candidate for Mayor of Charlotte in 2013
 Rodney W. Moore, state representative

Polling

Results

Republican primary

Candidates

Declared
 Vince Coakley, former TV news anchor

Endorsements

General election

Results

References

12th congressional district special election
North Carolina 12
North Carolina 12
2014 12 special
North Carolina 2014 12
North Carolina 12
United States House of Representatives 2014 12